Sylwester Szmyd (born 2 March 1978) is a Polish former professional road bicycle racer, who rode professionally between 2002 and 2016.

Born in Bydgoszcz, Szmyd competed as a climber who served as a leader in smaller stage races, and as a strong mountain domestique for his team leaders in the Grand Tours. He completed all of the 23 Grand Tours that he started during his career.

Professional career

In 2009, Szmyd scored the first victory of his career when he crossed the finish line atop the Mont Ventoux during the Critérium du Dauphiné Libéré. He had broken away with Alejandro Valverde and the pair finished together. Szmyd said afterward that he was so used to sacrifice himself as a domestique for his captains that his legs almost buckled in the last corner when he realized he would win.

In the 2012 Giro del Trentino, Szmyd was allowed to race for himself and placed well on the final two stages of the race, which were mountainous. In stage 3, he came in second place after tackling a very steep climb, the Punta Veleno ( at an average 15% gradient). The finish line was situated  after the summit. On the last stage to the Pordoi Pass, Szmyd finished in fourth position at the altitude finish, securing his third place in the overall classification. Snow was falling as he, race winner Domenico Pozzovivo and Damiano Cunego were accepting their awards on the podium.

He participated in the Giro d'Italia a couple of weeks later, riding in support of his leader Ivan Basso. He set the pace for the lead group numerous times in the hilly stages and managed a 28th general classification spot.

In December 2014 Szmyd announced he was joining the Polish  team on a one-year deal for 2015, after expressing dissatisfaction about his time at Movistar, where he was only selected for a Grand Tour once during his two years with the team.

Major results

1999
 4th Overall Ronde de l'Isard
2000
 2nd GP Capodarco
2001
 6th Overall Tour de Pologne
 9th Gran Premio de Llodio
2002
 3rd Gran Premio Fred Mengoni
 6th Schynberg-Rundfahrt
2003
 8th Overall Giro del Trentino
2004
 2nd GP Triberg-Schwarzwald
 4th Japan Cup
2005
 7th GP Industria & Artigianato di Larciano
2006
 5th Japan Cup
 6th Overall Giro del Trentino
 9th Overall Settimana Internazionale di Coppi e Bartali
 10th Overall Tour de Romandie
2007
 2nd Overall Settimana Ciclistica Lombarda
 7th Giro dell'Emilia
 9th Overall Tour de Romandie
2008
 5th Giro dell'Appennino
 8th Overall Giro del Trentino
 8th Overall Critérium du Dauphiné Libéré
 9th Overall Settimana Internazionale di Coppi e Bartali
2009
 1st Stage 5 Critérium du Dauphiné Libéré
 7th Overall Tour de Pologne
2010
 1st Stage 4 (TTT) Giro d'Italia
 6th Overall Tour de Pologne
 10th Overall Critérium du Dauphiné
2012
 3rd Overall Giro del Trentino
 7th Overall Tour de Romandie
2013
 9th Vuelta a la Comunidad de Madrid
2014
 3rd Overall Vuelta a Castilla y León
2015
 3rd Overall Tour of Croatia

Grand Tour general classification results timeline

References

External links

Profile on official Team Liquigas website

1978 births
Living people
Polish male cyclists
Olympic cyclists of Poland
Cyclists at the 2004 Summer Olympics
Sportspeople from Bydgoszcz